Cannon City is an unincorporated community in Cannon City Township, Rice County, Minnesota, United States, five miles northeast of Faribault.

The community is located at the junction of Rice County Road 20 (Cannon City Boulevard) and Crystal Lake Trail.

Cannon City was platted in 1855, and named after the nearby Cannon River.

The community of Cannon City was the model for Metropolisville in the novel The Mystery of Metropolisville by Edward Eggleston.

References

Unincorporated communities in Minnesota
Unincorporated communities in Rice County, Minnesota